Focillodes is a genus of moths of the family Erebidae. The genus was erected by George Thomas Bethune-Baker in 1906.

Species
Focillodes dinawa Bethune-Baker, 1906
Focillodes distorta Warren, 1903
Focillodes fulva Bethune-Baker, 1906
Focillodes medionigra Bethune-Baker, 1906
Focillodes subapicata Warren, 1903
Focillodes uncinata Pagenstecher, 1900

References

Calpinae